Where Greater Men Have Fallen is the eighth full-length album by Irish metal band Primordial. The album was released on November 25, 2014 through Metal Blade Records. A music video for the track 'Babel's Tower' was released on November 24, 2014.

The album reached #24 on the Top Heatseekers chart, #24 on Billboard's Top New Artist Chart and #43 on Billboard's Hard Music Chart, and #104 on Billboard's Independent Albums Chart.

Track listing

Critical reception

The album was generally well received by critics. Pitchfork wrote that "Compared to Primordial’s past successes, the stripped-and-centered approach might seem simplistic, but the hour-long result is more immediate because of it. From beginning to end, Fallen feels like a compulsory listen." About.com's Dan Drago also praised the album, concluding in his review that "Where Greater Men Have Fallen is more proof of their ability to grow and maintain such a high level of songwriting. Equal in stature to their last two releases, they seem to be reaching new heights and very few bands can match their passion. They have once again released a sure candidate for album of the year."

Many critics were particularly complimentary towards A.A. Nemtheanga's vocals on the album. Writing for Rolling Stone, Kim Kelly wrote that "Alan Averill is a vocal powerhouse, soaring atop melodic black/folk metal compositions that channel doom and gloom as well as triumph. [...] When Averill howls "The heart of your motherland will be ripped from her chest," a million ghosts cry out with him."

Personnel
Credits adapted from AllMusic.

Primordial
 A.A. Nemtheanga – Vocals, lyrics
 Ciáran MacUiliam – Guitars
 Michael O'Floinn – Guitars
 Pól MacAmlaigh – Bass
 Simon O'Laoghaire – Drums

Production and art
 Jaime Gomez Arellano – Producer, Engineer
 Costin Chioreanu – Artwork, Layout
 Jesko Mägle – Photography
 Marco Manzi – Photography 
 John Gallardo – Photography 
 Miluta Flueras – Back Cover Photo, Cover Photo

Charts

References

2014 albums
Primordial (band) albums